Yeangel Emilio Montero Manzano (born 25 December 1998) is a Venezuelan footballer who plays as a forward for Venezuelan Primera División club Mineros de Guayana.

Club career

Atlético Venezuela

Early years
Montero is a product of Atlético Venezuela and joined the club at the age of 16 from 40 Fútbol Club. He was born and raised in Higuerote, approximately an hour and a half from Caracas, and in an interview Montero revealed, that he travelled more than three hours a day to be able to train with Atlético Venezuela.

In 2014, he debuted for the U-18s and in 2015 he scored 12 goals in 24 games for the team. In December 2016, Montero signed a two-year deal with the club, after a good season where he had been a protagonist for the U-18s and also had played for the U-20s, although his young age, where he scored 10 goals.

Promotion to the first team
After a stunning 2017 season with the clubs U-20 team, where he scored 20 goals and made 9 assists, becoming the topscorer of the team and helping them winning the U-20 championship in Venezuela, he signed his first professional deal with the club and was promoted into the first team squad for the 2018 season.

Montero got his official debut for Atlético Venezuela on 24 February 2018 against Aragua FC in the Venezuelan Primera División. He started on the bench, before coming on as a substitute for Cristian Alessandrini in the half time. He made a total of 12 league appearances in that season and scored four goals.

In 2019, Montero had a loan spell at Estudiantes Caracas, where he played seven league game for the team, before returning to Atlético Venezuela for the 2020 season. In 2020, Montero played six league games for Atlético Venezuela.

Later career
On 4 March 2021, Montero joined Carabobo. On 19 January 2022, Montero moved to Monagas. In June 2022, he joined fellow league club UCV. In February 2023, Montero moved to Mineros de Guayana.

References

External links
 

Living people
1998 births
Association football forwards
Venezuelan footballers
Venezuelan Primera División players
Atlético Venezuela C.F. players
Estudiantes de Caracas players
Carabobo F.C. players
Monagas S.C. players
A.C.C.D. Mineros de Guayana players
People from Caracas